Isobel Agnes Arbuthnot (18701963) was an Irish-born botanist and botanical collector based in South Africa.

Biography

Arbuthnot was born in Belfast in 1870 and went to South Africa in 1888 for her health where she took a position as companion to the wife of Harry Bolus. There she also worked as a botanical collector and the botanical assistant on Bolus's expeditions. From 1918 until 1939 she worked in the Bolus Herbarium before moving to the Compton Herbarium before finally retiring in 1945.

References

1870 births
1963 deaths
20th-century Irish botanists
20th-century South African botanists
South African women botanists
Scientists from Belfast
20th-century South African women scientists
Irish women botanists